Bni Zoli is a settlement (rural commune) in Zagora Province, Drâa-Tafilalet region, Morocco. It has a population of 18,400.

References

Populated places in Zagora Province